In total, there are approximately 293 castles or ruins of castles in Armenia.

Castles in Aragatsotn Province

Castles in Ararat Province

Castles in Armavir Province

Castles in Gegharkunik Province

Castles in Lori Province

Castles in Kotayk Province

Castles in Shirak Province

Castles in Syunik Province

Castles in Vayots Dzor Province

Castles in Tavush Province

 Aghjkaghala Castle
 Aghli Berd
 Aghtamir Fortress
 Alberd
 Ardar Davit
 Arin Berd - Also known as Erebuni Fortress.
 Berdakar
 Berdavan Fortress - Most likely built between the 10th and 11th centuries; 17th-century reconstruction with church nearby (Tavush Province, Armenia).
 Berdidash
 Berdi Dosh
 Berdi Glukh
 Dzernak Fortress
 Erebuni Fortress - Also known as Arin Berd and Yerevani Berd; Massive Urartian fortress (Erebuni Masiv, Yervan, Armenia).
 Geghi Berd - Also known as Kakavaberd.
 Ghalinjakar - Commonly known as Berdavan Fortress.
 Ghaluchay Fort
 Ghslakh Fortress
 Heghi Dar
 Hnaberd Fortress
 Horom Citadel - Ancient Bronze Age through Urartian fortification (Shirak Province, Armenia).
 Hraskaberd
 Ishkanaberd - Formerly Teyseba, now commonly known as Odzaberd.
 Ishkanats Amrots
 Kaftarli Fort
 Kapuyt Berd
 Karmir Berd - Fortified settlement from the end of the 2nd millennium BC, located along the right bank of the Hrazdan River (Yerevan, Armenia).
 Khoshap
 Lori Berd
 Matsnaberd
 Metsep Fortress
 Mrtbi Dzor
 Solyani Fort
 Tavush Fortress
 Teishebaini - The site of a Urartian city located within modern Yerevan.
 Tsamakaberd Fortress
 Tsitsernakaberd - Once an Iron Age fortress, now the modern Armenian Genocide Memorial (Yerevan, Armenia).
 Vanki Amrots
 Yerevani Berd - Commonly known as Erebuni Fortress.
 Yergevanits Fortress
 Yervandakert Fortress
 Zeva Fortress
 Zhami Dar

See also
 List of castles
 List of castles in Nagorno-Karabakh Republic
 Armenian Palaces
 List of monasteries in Armenia
 List of caravanserais in Armenia

References

 
Armenia
Armenia
Castles
Armenia
Castles